Mynydd Ystyfflau-Carn is a Site of Special Scientific Interest in Carmarthenshire, Wales.

See also
List of Sites of Special Scientific Interest in Carmarthen & Dinefwr

References

Sites of Special Scientific Interest in Carmarthen & Dinefwr